Alexander Baronjan (born 22 March 1976) is a German former yacht racer who participated in the 2000 Summer Olympics. He competed in the Mistral One Design Class (Windsurfing) and finished in 9th place.

References

External links
 
 
 

1976 births
Living people
German male sailors (sport)
German windsurfers
Olympic sailors of Germany
Sailors at the 2000 Summer Olympics – Mistral One Design